Židovice is a municipality and village in Jičín District in the Hradec Králové Region of the Czech Republic. It has about 100 inhabitants.

Geography
It lies in the Central Elbe Table.

Gallery

References

Villages in Jičín District